Małgorzata Niezabitowska (born 1948 in Warsaw) is a Polish journalist and politician. From 1989 to 1990 she served as a spokesperson for Prime Minister Tadeusz Mazowiecki's cabinet.  She is married to Tomasz Tomaszewski (photographer), a National Geographic photographer.

References

1948 births
Living people